Lorne Entress is an American drummer, multi-instrumentalist and record producer, currently living in Glastonbury, Connecticut, United States. 

Entress has worked with a wide range of artists in pop, folk, Americana, blues and jazz styles.  He has produced albums for Lori McKenna, Catie Curtis, Ronnie Earl, Mighty Sam McClain, singer-songwriter Mark Erelli, Amy Black, Ronnie Earl, and many others. While known mainly as a producer and drummer/percussionist, Entress has been described as playing "every instrument under the sun, all with taste and restraint." On recordings his instruments have included guitars, keyboards, accordion, bass, autoharp, dulcimer, synths, and mandolin among others.

Collaborations
Entress has performed and or recorded with the following acts: 
 Johnny Adams
 Beth Amsel
 Big Al Anderson
 Austin and Elliot
 Amy Black
 Dennis Brennen
 Henry Butler
 Dave Carter and Tracy Grammer
 Susan Cattaneo
 Catie Curtis
 Kris Delmhorst
 Madi Diaz
 Ben Demerath
 Ronnie Earl
 Mark Erelli
 Jeffrey Foucault
 Peter Francis
 Four Piece Suit
 Vance Gilbert
 Tracy Grammer
 Jim Henry
 John Hogg
 The Horseflies
 Johnny Hoy
 Diana Jones
 Bruce Katz
 Jonathan Kingham
 Jess Klein
 Shane Koss
 Bobby Keyes
 Jenna Lindbo
 Lucky Stereo
 David Maxwell
 Bruce MacKay
 Larry MaCray
 Mighty Sam McClain
 Erin McKeown
 Lori McKenna
 Alastair Moock
 Charlie Musselwhite
 Nerrisa & Katryna Nields
 Ellis Paul
 The Radio Kings
 Hayley Reardon
 Kayla Ringelheim
 The Shabboo All Stars
 The Story
 Les Sampou
 Susan Tedeschi
 Toni Lynn Washington
 Brooks Williams
 Kim Wilson

Books 
 Time and Drumming (Mel Bay)
 Guitar Hymnal (Commissioned by the First Church of Christ, Scientist)

References

External links
 Official web site
 MySpace
 Kris Delmhorst web site

Year of birth missing (living people)
Living people
American drummers
American multi-instrumentalists
Record producers from Connecticut
People from Glastonbury, Connecticut
Place of birth missing (living people)